Felipe Arturo Camarena García (born 5 February 1956) is a Mexican politician affiliated with the PVEM. He currently serves as Deputy of the LXII Legislature of the Mexican Congress representing Guanajuato.

References

1956 births
Living people
Politicians from Guanajuato
Ecologist Green Party of Mexico politicians
21st-century Mexican politicians
Deputies of the LXII Legislature of Mexico
Members of the Chamber of Deputies (Mexico) for Guanajuato